Smart Politics is a 1948 American film directed by Will Jason and starring Freddie Stewart and June Preisser. It is part of The Teen Agers series made by Monogram Pictures.

Plot

Cast
Freddie Stewart as Freddie Trimball
June Preisser as Dodie Rogers 
Frankie Darro as Roy Dunne
Warren Mills as Lee Watson
Noel Neill as Betty Rogers
Donald MacBride as The Mayor (Phineas Wharton, Jr./ Phineas Wharton, Sr.)
Gene Krupa and His Orchestra
Martha Davis as Martha
Source:

Songs
"Kitchen Blues" – words and music by Freddie Stewart and Hal Collins
"The Young Man with a Beat" – words and music by Freddie Stewart
"Isn't This a Night for Love" – words and music by Will Jason, Sid Robin and Val Burton
"Sincerely Yours" – words and music by Will Jason and Sid Robin
Source:

References

External links
 

1948 films
1948 musical comedy films
1940s teen films
American black-and-white films
American musical comedy films
Monogram Pictures films
Films directed by Will Jason
1940s English-language films
1940s American films